Fossil Rim Wildlife Center is a 501(c)(3) non-profit conservation center near Glen Rose, Texas. They specialize in the breeding of endangered species, public education, scientific research and natural land management. The facility has over 1,000 animals from 50 species. Guests have access to guided and self-guided tours across the center's 1800 acres of Texas Hill Country, as well as lodging, dining and educational facilities.

History 
The center was first an exotic herding ranch acquired by a Texan businessman from the oil industry named Tom Mantzel. He bought the ranch in 1973 and renamed it Fossil Rim Wildlife Ranch. The project was at first a weekend retreat for Mantzel, but it soon became a full-time occupation. Concerned by the extinction of species, Mantzel started experimenting with breeding endangered species in 1982 with Grévy's zebras. Fossil Rim was the first ranch to participate in the Species Survival Plan, an initiative partnered with the Association of Zoos and Aquariums (AZA), and their success with zebras prompted the association to continue its work with Fossil Rim.

Mantzel decided to open the zoo to the public in 1984; with the oil crash, he was in dire need of funding to continue his breeding program. With a small team, he built a road along the 1,400 acres of land and opened a snack bar and a souvenir shop. He also brought a few more animals to bring in the public, Grant’s zebras, ostriches, and reticulated giraffes.

A volunteer program was developed to help with the visits, and the park started his education mission. In 1985, more endangered species were brought to the ranch, African scimitar-horned oryx. At that time the park got permission from the U.S. government to import cheetah for a breeding program, one of the most successful projects of the center. But even with the success, the maintenance costs were still too high, and in 1987 Mantzel start looking for partners.

Jim Jackson and Krystyna Jurzykowski were looking for a venture to engage themselves in conservation, planning to open a marine park in Martinique. Learning that they were seeking information from the Fossil Rim Ranch, Mantzel approached the couple to ask them if they would be interested in partnering with him to save the park, giving operational funds for the park. But seeing foreclosure as imminent, they decided to buy the ranch, which became the Fossil Rim Wildlife Center on May 7, 1987.

Areas
Fossil Rim's property covers 1800 acres of hill country topography including rolling hills, limestone deposits, and wooded and open land. In addition to providing habitat for the facility's animals, this land is also used for hay production and the protection of native Texas flora and fauna. The property is divided into several pastures, some of which guests have the opportunity to travel through on tours. The areas include: 

Front Pasture 

The first pasture guests enter during a tour. Houses various hoof stock such as the blackbuck and wildebeest.   

Buffer Pasture 

This area acts not only as pasture for crepuscular species like the bongo and the greater kudu, but as hay producing land. 

Main Pasture 

So called for its status as the largest pasture guests can travel through on tour, the main pasture houses many of Fossil Rim's species. 

Preserve Pasture 

This pasture is home to some of the most recognizable animals on Fossil Rim property including giraffes.   

The Jim Jackson Intensive Management Area 

This area, also known as the IMA, is off-limits to guests unless on a guided tour. This area houses species that are typically vulnerable and endangered, and have historically had better conservation breeding success with less human interaction. For this reason, these species are kept out of the public eye more than other animals on property, so that staff can better assess their needs. This area is well known for containing one of two cheetah facilities on site. The other location, known as Cheetah Hill, is open to guests on a standard drive-though tour. 

The Overlook 

One of two locations on property where guests can exit their cars, the Overlook is home to the Overlook Café, restrooms, the conservation-focused Nature Store, and the Children's Animal Center (CAC).   

Other land owned by Fossil Rim is used for hay production, educational facilities, conservation and administrative buildings.

Animal Species
Fossil Rim Wildlife Center houses over 1000 animals in 50 species, of which 22 are vulnerable or endangered, including:

 Addax
 African spurred tortoise
 American bison
 American lamancha
 Aoudad
 Arabian oryx
 Attwater's prairie chicken
 Axis deer
 Black-footed cat
 Black-tailed jackrabbit
 Blackbuck
 Blue and gold macaw
 Cheetah
 Waterbuck
 Wildebeest
 Dama gazelle
 Emu
 Fallow deer
 Gemsbok
 Giraffe
 Greater kudu
 Grevy's zebra
 Hartmann's mountain zebra
 Little corella (Bare-eyed cockatoo)
 Maned wolf
 Mexican gray wolf
 Mountain bongo
 Nigerian dwarf goat
 Nile Lechwe
 Nine-banded armadillo
 Przewalski's horse
 Red-crowned crane
 Red deer
 Red wolf
 Roadrunner
 Roan
 Sable Antelope
 Sandhill crane
 Scimitar-horned oryx
 South-central black rhinoceros 
 Southern white rhinoceros
 Texas tortoise
 Vietnamese pot-bellied pig
 White-tailed deer
 Wild Turkey

Conservation 
The first mission of the Fossil Rim Wildlife Center is the conservation of species through scientific research, responsible management of natural resources, professional training and public education.

Conservation Centers for Species Survival 
The Fossil Rim Wildlife Center is one of the five founding organizations of the Conservation Centers for Species Survival (C2S2), a consortium created to develop programs for the sustainability of endangered species. The center brings the expertise of many large-scale zoological and environmental institutions to address issues related to the conservation of endangered species through study, management and recovery plans. The central office of the consortium is in the Fossil Rim Wildlife Center.

Scimitar Horned Oryx 
Fossil Rim Wildlife Center participated in the reproduction and rehabilitation program of the Scimitar-horned Oryx in Chad and the rest of sub-saharan Africa. The species is extinct in the wild since the 1980s (poaching, loss of habitat and political strife are some of the causes of its decline), but a worldwide breeding program helped the restoration of the species. A first herd of 25 beasts was released in Chad in April 2016 with collars giving their position via satellite to follow them in their habitat. The Fossil Rim helped in the evaluation of the collar on their own herd inside the park to make sure the animals would not be incapacitated by them.

Attwater's prairie chicken 
The center participates in a program to rehabilitate the Attwater's prairie chicken, a small grouse native of the coastal plains of Louisiana and Texas, now one of the most endangered bird species in America. Fossil Rim Wildlife Center and five other zoos initiated a breeding program for the species in 1992. Between 170 and 175 birds are released in the wild every year, of which half were bred in the center. Even if the species has not grown in the wild, the project prevented complete extinction.

Cheetah 
The center has one of the most successful cheetah breeding programs in the world, with more than 135 feline bred and raised there. Fossil Rim has two cheetah areas that can house a combine 25-plus cats in a simulating, comfortable environment. The cheetah breeding program emphasizes genetic diversity and multiple mate choices so that the healthiest cubs possible can be born with minimal stress on the parents.

Affiliations and Awards 
Fossil Rim is an accredited member of the Zoological Association of America (ZAA), the Association of Zoos and Aquariums (AZA), a member and the home base of the Conservation Centers for Species Survival (C2S2), the International Rhino Foundation (IRF), the Sahara Conservation Fund (SCF), the Saola Working Group (SWG) of the International Union for Conservation of Nature (IUCN), the Giraffe Conservation Foundation (GCF), the Exotic Wildlife Association (EWA), the Second Ark Foundation, the USDA, the U.S. Fish and Wildlife Service, Tarleton State University, and the Glen Rose Independent School District.

Gallery

Notes

Safari parks
Zoos in Texas
Buildings and structures in Somervell County, Texas
Tourist attractions in Somervell County, Texas
Protected areas of Somervell County, Texas
1984 establishments in Texas
Zoos established in 1984